Paruroctonus boreus, commonly known as the northern scorpion, is a species of scorpion in the family Vaejovidae. Ranging from Arizona to Canada.

Distribution 
Can be as far north as 52° N. Several anecdotal reports show them found near Medicine Hat, Alberta during dry years.  It is the only scorpion found in Canada, with specimens collected in the Okanagan valley of British Columbia and more widely in Alberta.

Description 
The adult female is consistently bigger than the male Averaging around 38.9 mm while the males average around 35.5 mm.

Behavior 
Boreus is almost exclusively nocturnal with most movements and hunts taking place during the night. Emergence from their burrows occurs between 21:30 and 23:00, will not leave their burrow if the temperatures are below 10 °C. Shows increased activity in the 3-5 days following a rainfall. There is a dramatic discrepancy between how much the males and the females move around daily, males will routinely roam up to six times as far as their female counterparts. 

Boreus will engage in territorial fights with the larger scorpion usually winning the fight and then cannibalize the loser. Uses rayleigh waves to aid in prey detection. Younger scorpions tend to be more willing to use their stingers for both defense and offense as opposed to older scorpions. Feeds on the head of its prey first and will leave the hard exoskeleton as waste.

Reproduction 
During the birthing process the females assume a stilting position on their rear walking legs. The young, of which there may be ten to forty, pass through the birth opening covered in a translucent membrane. The young offspring were observed to free themselves from the membrane in ten to twenty minutes. After freeing themselves from the birth membrane the offspring will ascend the mother’s walking legs and assume a grouped up position on her dorsum. The young offspring will have their first molt about 12 days and will then a week later begin to roam around the mothers carapace more freely. The young feed on their own castings and their first exuvium until they make their first hunt around 13-14 days.

References

External links
SYSTEMATICS OF THE  SCORPION FAMILY VAEJOVIDAE

Vaejovidae
Arthropods of Canada
Animals described in 1854